Brewster's Millions is a 1985 American comedy film directed by Walter Hill. The film stars Richard Pryor and John Candy. The screenplay by Herschel Weingrod and Timothy Harris was based on the 1902 novel of the same name by George Barr McCutcheon. It is the seventh film based on the story.

Plot
Monty Brewster is a Minor League Baseball pitcher with the Hackensack Bulls. He and his best friend, Spike Nolan, the Bulls' catcher, are arrested after a post-game bar fight. A man offers to post their bail if they will come to New York City with him. At the Manhattan law office of Granville & Baxter, Brewster is told that his recently deceased great-uncle Rupert Horn, whom he has never met, has left him his entire $300 million fortune but only if he can complete a challenge with several conditions.

Brewster can choose to receive $1 million upfront or attempt to inherit the whole estate by spending $30 million in 30 days. In the former case, the law firm becomes the executor of the estate, collecting a fee for performing this service and dividing the remainder among several charities. In the latter case, Brewster may not own any assets that are not already his at the end of the 30 days. He must get value for the services of anyone he hires, he may not give it away (except for 5% in gambling losses and 5% to charity) nor may he willfully damage anything bought with the money. Finally, he must keep it secret. If he fails to meet all terms, he forfeits any remaining balance and inherits nothing. Brewster decides to take the $30 million challenge, and Angela Drake, a paralegal from the law firm, is assigned to accompany him and keep track of his spending.

Brewster, who has never earned more than $11,000 a year, rents an expensive hotel suite at the Plaza Hotel, hires personal staff on exorbitant salaries and places bad gambling bets. However, Spike makes good investments, earning Brewster money. Realizing that he is making no headway, Brewster decides to run for mayor of New York City and throws most of his money at a protest campaign urging a vote for "none of the above."  The two major candidates threaten to sue Brewster for his confrontational rhetoric, but they settle out of court for several million dollars. Brewster then hires the New York Yankees for a three-inning exhibition against the Bulls, with himself as the pitcher. He is forced to end his protest campaign when he learns that he is leading in the polls as a write-in candidate; the job carries an annual salary of $60,000, which is considered an asset under the terms of the will. Blowing his last $38,000 on a party after the game, Brewster becomes fed up with money and is heartbroken that Spike, Angela and others around him do not understand his actions.

On the final day, he finds that the sycophantic treatment he received from his entourage is gone. Shunned by everyone he knows, Brewster makes his way to the law office. Having withdrawn from the election, he learns that the city voted "None of the Above," forcing another election in which none of the previous candidates are running.

Warren Cox, a junior lawyer from the law firm and Angela's fiancé, has been bribed by the firm to ensure that Brewster fails to spend the entire $30 million. Moments before time expires, Cox hands Brewster some money previously thought to have been spent and informs him he is not broke. Shortly before Brewster signs, Angela learns of the plot and reveals it to him. Brewster punches Cox, who threatens to sue and declines Brewster's offer of the money as compensation. Realizing that he will need a lawyer, Brewster pays the money to Angela as a retainer. With the transaction completed and all of the money now gone, Brewster fulfills the terms of the will and inherits the entire $300 million.

Cast

Production
The movie was the first film greenlit by Frank Price after he became head of production at Universal. The director was Walter Hill who had intended to make a film of Dick Tracy but left that project and was available. He had never made a comedy before, but had made the successful 48 Hrs. which featured comic scenes and a comic lead, Eddie Murphy. The script was written by the writers of Murphy's Trading Places.

"I'm always making westerns," Hill said. "Whether it's a movie that takes place in the future... or an action- adventure like 48 Hrs., what I'm really doing is making cowboy movies.... I like westerns because everything is very clear in them. 'I like movies in which the story line is simple and straightforward and the characters are confronted with issues of life and death. But Hollywood has decided that people don't like westerns anymore, so I have to make these other movies and pretend they're not westerns... My idea of a good movie is to take very clearly defined characters and put them in the highest possible jeopardy and then see what happens," Hill said.

Hill said Richard Pryor “didn't believe that he was funny unless he took drugs, and he believed that if he took drugs he would die. Also, he had money problems, of course, so he had to work and take jobs and make lots of money. So it was difficult, but I liked Richard very much.”

The Hackensack Bulls' baseball park was a set from the TV series Bay City Blues, formerly located at the LADWP Valley Generating Station in Sun Valley, California.

Princess Anne visited the set during filming as part of her US tour.

Walter Hill later said he purposefully made the film "to improve his bank account and success quotient".

Reception
The film received mixed to negative reviews. On review aggregator Rotten Tomatoes, the film holds an approval rating of 35% based on 23 reviews, with an average score of 4.90/10. The website's critical consensus reads, "With Richard Pryor's trademark ribald humor tamped down, Brewster's Millions feels like a missed opportunity to update a classic story." On Metacritic, the film received a score of 37 based on 13 reviews, indicating "generally unfavorable reviews".

The staff review in Variety said bluntly: "It's hard to believe a comedy starring Richard Pryor and John Candy is no funnier than this". Janet Maslin, in her review for The New York Times, called the film "a screwball comedy minus the screws" which "does nothing to accommodate Mr. Pryor's singular comic talents". Director Walter Hill, she said, did not understand "the advantages of screwball timing," and the film's slow pace and lack of style gives it "a fatuous artificiality". She went on to praise the film's supporting cast, including John Candy, but said that the "flat" screenplay forces Candy to repeat himself.

Walter Hill later called the movie "an aberration in the career line" being his only flat out comedy. He added that "whatever [the film's] deficiencies, I think the wistful quality was there. I was happy about that. The picture did well and made money."

References

External links
 
 
 
 Brewster's Millions at the 80s Movie Gateway
 
 
 

1985 films
1980s English-language films
1985 comedy films
1980s sports comedy films
American baseball films
American sports comedy films
Films about inheritances
Films based on Brewster's Millions
Films directed by Walter Hill
Films produced by Joel Silver
Films scored by Ry Cooder
Films set in Los Angeles
Films set in New Jersey
Films set in New York City
Films with screenplays by Timothy Harris (writer)
Films with screenplays by Herschel Weingrod
Silver Pictures films
Universal Pictures films
1980s American films